Victor P. Tsilonis (also known as "Viktor P. Tsilonis") is an international jurist and Greece's Nominee for the judicial elections of the International Criminal Court, which is based in The Hague, Netherlands. He is also a member of the International Criminal Court Bar Association (ICCBA), currently serving as the ICCBA Focal Point for Greece and ICCBA Vice President for Victims (2021-2022). In 2019-2020 he was elected in the same position (jointly with Megan Hirst) and served simultaneously as the Chairman of the Professional Standards Advisory Committee. Tsilonis currently serves a four-year term (2018–2022) as an elected ICC Disciplinary Board Alternate Member and has tried four disciplinary cases under this capacity.

Early life and education 
Victor P. Tsilonis was born in Thessaloniki, Greece, on 16 July 1976. He obtained his Bachelor of Laws Degree (LL.B.) from the Aristotle University of Thessaloniki, Greece; his Master of Laws Degree (LL.M.) from the University of Nottingham, UK; and his Doctor of Laws (PhD) from the Aristotle University of Thessaloniki, Greece.

Legal career

18-year experience in defending human rights 
Tsilonis has been a legal counsel in Greece since 2004. He is the founder and principal barrister of the niche law firm NewLaw and represents clients in criminal procedures and human rights law cases before the Greek courts and authorities. Fourteen of the cases in which he has acted as a legal counsel are accessible through “NOMOS”, a Greek legal database, while several others have attracted the media's attention.

ICTY, ICC and academic qualifications 
His expertise in the field of international criminal justice dates back to 2004, when he spent six months as a Junior Legal Advisor at the Office of the Prosecutor of the International Criminal Tribunal for the former Yugoslavia (Milošević Case). He then completed a PhD thesis on “The Jurisdiction of the International Criminal Court: the Prerequisites for its Exercise” (AUTh, 2016). He is included in the List of Counsel before the International Criminal Court since April 2016.

Teaching international criminal law 
He currently teaches the postgraduate course "Criminal Law against Corruption and Financial Crime"  at the Hellenic Open University (2022-2023). During the 2018–19 academic year, Tsilonis taught three lectures of the postgraduate course of International Criminal Justice as a visiting lecturer at the Law School of the Democritus University of Thrace. Moreover, he has also taught as a Research Fellow, Lecturer or Academic Director at the International Hellenic University, the Aristotle University of Thessaloniki, the Democritus University of Thrace, the Lord Byron School of Foreign Languages and the Thessaloniki Bar Association, the courses of International Criminal Justice, Criminal Law, Criminology, Prisoners’ Rights, Legal Translation, Legal Terminology, and Legal English Skills (TOLES).

International Criminal Court Bar Association 
Tsilonis is an internationally recognised expert on international criminal law, included in OSCE Consultancy Roster of Legal Experts (Vienna, 2018) and the Roster of Experts of the International Nuremberg Principles Academy (May 2017). He is a member of the International Criminal Court Bar Association since its foundation in 2016 and the current ICCBA Vice President for Victims (2021-2022). In 2019-2020 he was elected in the same position (jointly with Megan Hirst) and served simultaneously as the Chairman of the Professional Standards Advisory Committee. In November 2022 ICCBA members nominated him for president.

International Law Association and European Society of International Law 
He is also a member of the International Law Association (Committee: International Protection of Consumers) and the European Society of International Law.

International Criminal Court 
In 2019, Tsilonis was elected as an Alternate Member of the Disciplinary Board of the International Criminal Court. Under this capacity, he has sat as a judge in four disciplinary hearings, and co-drafted the decision in the Case: Disciplinary Complaint against Mr Goran Sluiter in December 2019.

In May 2020, Tsilonis was nominated to be Greece's candidate for the 2020 judicial elections of the International Criminal Court. On 30 September 2020 the Report of the Advisory Committee on Nominations of Judges on the work of its seventh session concluded that  “''Based on both his professional experience and his answers during the interview, the Committee concluded that the candidate is highly qualified for appointment as Judge of the International Criminal Court".

References

External links 
 1. NOMOS
 2. Registry
 3. TSILONIS, Viktor Panagiotis
 4. Victor Tsilonis for ICC Judge in 2020
 5. TOLES

1976 births
Living people
People from Thessaloniki